Adenike Adebukola Akinsemolu is a Nigerian sustainability advocate, educator, author and a social entrepreneur. She is a lecturer at Obafemi Awolowo University (Adeyemi College Campus). She is known as one of the country's leading experts on environmental sustainability.

Akinsemolu is the founder of Green Campus Initiative, the first campus based environmental advocacy organization in Nigeria. Green institute, the sustainability research and education institution. In her cause to promote girl child education, she founded the Girl Prize which provides financial and mentorship support for young Nigerian secondary school girl

Akinsemolu is a Robert Bosch Stiftung and Nigeria Energy Awards Awardee.

She is an author of publicated journals including the journal on the role of microorganisms in achieving sustainable development goals

Career
Adenike Akinsemolu was born in Ondo State, Nigeria. She holds Master's and Ph.D degrees in Environmental Microbiology from Babcock University and Federal University of Technology, and a postgraduate diploma in Education from Obafemi Awolowo University. She worked with the Clinton Foundation in New York and later established the Green Campus Initiative.

Akinsemolu is an Associate Fellow of the Royal Commonwealth Society and a member of the National Steering Committee of the Sustainable Energy Practitioners Association of Nigeria (SEPAN) under the Ministry of Power. She is a Robert Bosch Stiftung Young Researcher Awardee. In October 2015, she won Nigeria Energy Awards for Energy Efficiency and Advocacy.

She advocated for the inclusion of green education and sustainability in the Nigerian academic curriculum. In 2015, Sahara Reporters did a documentary on her Green Journey.

Akinsemolu serves as an Academic Associate with the United Nations Sustainable Development Solutions Network and a Scientific Committee Member of the 6th Annual International Conference on Sustainable Development (ICSD), at The Earth Institute, Columbia University. In 2020, Akinsemolu published the book: "The Principles of Green and Sustainability Science", that examines sustainability issues in Africa.

In March 2021, Akinsemolu was recognized as one of the top youth leaders in conservation on the continent, becoming one of the Nigerian winners of the Africa’s Top 100 Young Conservation Leaders award by the Africa Alliance of the YMCA, the World Organization of the Scout Movement, the African Wildlife Foundation and World Wildlife Fund.

Green Institute 

In 2015, Akinsemolu founded Green Campus Initiative (GCI), the first campus-based environmental advocacy organization in Nigeria. Its organizational model was recognized at the Fourth Annual Green Campuses Conference 2015 at the University of the Western Cape in South Africa with awards for green campus activities. GCI is a member of the UN Sustainable Development Network, has over 500 ambassadors, and has trained more than 5,500 students across 28 country's universities. In 2017, the Green Campus Initiative developed into the Green Institute, the sustainability research and training institution, and a social enterprise. Professor Damilola S. Olawuyi became the first president of the institute. The institute provides academic programs on Sustainability and activities on building social entrepreneurship, in line with meeting the United Nations Sustainable Development Goals. The organization is the first academic institution in Nigeria to finance[college tuition costs through a waste management program “Trash for education” providing students with "credits" in return for the collected waste, which is later purchased by the state government and private enterprises.

In June 2020, The Green Institute organized a global sustainability summit on World Environment Day, gathering over twenty five sustainability leaders from various countries, including the renowned economic environmentalist Jeffrey Sachs.

Social issues and advocacy 
Akinsemolu has promoted the girl child education cause and founded the "Girl Prize", a scholarship and mentorship program. She participated in the Clinton Foundation relief mission following the 2004 Indian Ocean earthquake and Hurricane Katrina in New Orleans.

Publications

The role of microorganisms in achieving the sustainable development goals (SDG).
The vulnerability of women to climate change in coastal regions of Nigeria: A case of the Ilaje community in Ondo State.

Awards And Recognitions 
Robert Bosch Stiftung Young Researcher Award.
Nigeria Energy Awards for Energy Efficiency and Advocacy, 2015.
Member of the National Steering Committee of the Sustainable Energy Practitioners Association of Nigeria (SEPAN)
Academic Associate with the United Nations Sustainable Development Solutions Network.
Scientific Committee Member of the 6th Annual International Conference on Sustainable Development (ICSD)

Bibliography 

 The Principles of Green and Sustainability Science, Springer, 2020,

References

Year of birth missing (living people)
Living people
Nigerian women academics
21st-century Nigerian businesswomen
21st-century Nigerian businesspeople
Nigerian women company founders
Nigerian nonprofit businesspeople
Nigerian environmentalists
Nigerian women environmentalists
Nigerian social entrepreneurs
Babcock University alumni
Federal University of Technology Akure alumni
People from Ondo State
Nigerian women educators
Nigerian women business executives